Tunganistan (回斯坦, meaning"the homeland of Hui people"), also called Dunganistan (named after the Dungan people), was an independently administered region in the southern part of the Chinese province Xinjiang from 1934 to 1937, contemporaneous to the Chinese Civil War in China proper. The name "Tunganistan" was coined by the Austrian Mongolia expert Walther Heissig. The territory included the oases of the southern Tarim Basin and the centre of the region was Khotan. Tunganistan was surrounded on three sides by troops loyal to Xinjiang governor Sheng Shicai and to the south by the Tibetan Plateau.

History 
In 1934 (after the First East Turkestan Republic ended), the Muslim Tungan warlord Ma Zhongying vanished into Soviet territory. His successor was Ma Hushan, who fled from Kashgar to Khotan. Ma Hushan regularly received telegrams, ostensibly from his brother-in-law in the USSR, promising the leader of Tunganistan that Ma Zhongying would soon return.

Ma Hushan governed the region from 1934 until 1937, he was called "King" by his subjects. During his rule the Hui Muslims of Inner China governed the territory like a colony with Turkic Muslim subjects. In Tunganistan, taxation was heavy in order to support the needs of the 36th Division of the Chinese National Revolutionary Army. Farmers and merchants were exploited for the benefit of the military garrisons. Forced conscription was common.

In 1935, the troops of Tunganistan crushed the Charkhlik Revolt in the region of present-day Ruoqiang County.

Additionally by 1935, inflation was out of control, homesick Tungan troops were deserting, and Uyghurs frequently fought with Tungan soldiers in the streets of Khotan.

The British writer and adventurer Peter Fleming and the Swiss adventurer Ella Maillart travelled through Tunganistan. Fleming afterwards described in his writings (especially in his book News from Tartary) the region.

In 1937, Soviet troops attacked Tunganistan and incorporated it into the realm of Sheng Shicai's regime. Ma Hushan, who was in mail contact with Chiang Kai-shek, expected some kind of help from the Nationalist government in Nanjing, but he did not receive any help of any kind.

Trivia
 British historian Michael Dillon claimed that the terminus Dunganistan was meant "humorously" without citing any sources.

See also
Southern Xinjiang
Xinjiang Wars

References

External links 

 Memories of Tunganistan: Saipulla Mutallip’s Qarangghu Tagh
 Alleged flag of Tunganistan
 Tunganistan in the BrillOnline Reference Works

Former countries in Chinese history
Warlord cliques in Republican China
Xinjiang Wars
Ma clique
States and territories established in 1934
1934 establishments in China
1937 disestablishments in China
Dungan